List of African countries by GDP may refer to:

List of African countries by GDP (nominal)
List of African countries by GDP (PPP)

Lists of countries by GDP